Nuclear prelamin A recognition factor like is a protein that in humans is encoded by the NARFL gene.

References

Further reading